The Women's combined competition of the Lillehammer 1994 Olympics was held at Kvitfjell and Hafjell.

The defending world champion was Miriam Vogt of Germany, while Austria's Anita Wachter was the defending World Cup combined champion, and Pernilla Wiberg was the 1994 World Cup.

Results

References 

Women's combined
Alp
Olymp